Tawakkul Operation (Persian: عملیات توکل) is the name of a military operation during Iran–Iraq War (in general area of Abadan) which was launched by Iran's army—plus a number of militaries from Islamic Revolutionary Guard Corps, and headquarters of irregular wars—on 10 January 1981. Armors (of Iranian forces) began it from two axes, and the infantries started it through the third axis.

The commanders of Arvand-Headquarters who had the command of the mentioned operation (of Tawakkul), planned the operation to defeat the siege of Abadan (and likewise reclaim the east area of Karun River; and rejecting the enemy until the international border of Shalamcheh and Khin-river).

A number of Iraqi soldiers at a part of Abadan were captured by Iranians and the line of Iraqi forces was destroyed. Iranian forces finally could not stabilize their situation or reach their planned aims.

Goals 
The goals of the operation were:
 Liberation of the occupied area of Sar-e-Pol at the east of Karun (river);
 Liberation of Mahshahr-Abadan road;
 Defeating the siege of Abadan;
 Eventually, rejecting the enemy (Iraqi forces) from the east of Karun and reaching international borders.

See also 
 Operation Samen-ol-A'emeh (Broking the Iraqi Siege of Abadan)

References 

1981 in Iran
Military operations of the Iran–Iraq War
Iran–Iraq War